The 1990–91 Detroit Red Wings season saw the team return to the playoffs after missing the previous season, despite winning only thirty-four games. Until the 2016–17 season, this was the Red Wings' last losing season, who were to set a National Hockey League record for the most consecutive winning seasons during the following two decades.

Offseason

Regular season

Final standings

Schedule and results

Playoffs
At 34–38–8, the Red Wings finished third in the Campbell Conference.  In the playoffs, they faced the St. Louis Blues, who had finished 47–22–11 (and second in the Campbell Conference). The Red Wings were beaten in the seven-game series, three victories to four.

Round 1: St. Louis Blues vs. Detroit Red Wings

Player statistics

Regular season
Scoring

Goaltending

Playoffs
Scoring

Goaltending

Note: GP = Games played; G = Goals; A = Assists; Pts = Points; +/- = Plus-minus PIM = Penalty minutes; PPG = Power-play goals; SHG = Short-handed goals; GWG = Game-winning goals;
      MIN = Minutes played; W = Wins; L = Losses; T = Ties; GA = Goals against; GAA = Goals-against average;  SO = Shutouts; SA=Shots against; SV=Shots saved; SV% = Save percentage;

Awards and records

Transactions

Draft picks
Detroit's draft picks at the 1990 NHL Entry Draft held at the BC Place in Vancouver, British Columbia.

Farm teams

See also
1990–91 NHL season

References

External links
 

1990–91 NHL season by team
1990–91 in American ice hockey by team
1990-91
Detroit Red Wings
Detroit Red Wings